Peter Gerber (born March 16, 1992) is a competitive ice dancer. Competing for Poland, (with former partner Justyna Plutowska), he is the 2013 Finlandia Trophy bronze medalist and 2014 Bavarian Open champion.

Personal life
Peter Gerber is a retired competitive Ice Dancer of Poland. Born March 16, 1992 in Etobicoke, Ontario, Canada. He is a 2010 recipient of the Overcoming Adversity Achievement Award from Skate Canada. He holds dual Canadian and Polish citizenship. He is married to his ice skating partner Mariyah Gerber since 2018.

Career 
Gerber began skating at the age of six or seven. He teamed up with Baily Carroll in 2001. They represented Canada until 2009 and then Poland starting in 2010. In the 2008–09 season, Gerber broke his leg  and Carroll her wrist. Carroll/Gerber won the 2011 Polish national junior title and were assigned to the 2011 World Junior Championships where they placed 22nd. They parted ways in September 2011.

Gerber teamed up with Justyna Plutowska in June 2012. They were coached by Igor Shpilband in Novi, Michigan and represented GKS Stoczniowiec Gdańsk. Plutowska/Gerber made their debut at the 2012 U.S. International Classic, finishing 8th. They took the silver medal at the 2013 Polish Championships and placed 27th at the 2013 World Championships.

In the 2013–14 season, Plutowska/Gerber placed 9th at the U.S. International Classic before competing at the 2013 Nebelhorn Trophy, the final Olympic qualifier. They were 14th in the short dance and 8th in the free dance, finishing 10th overall at Nebelhorn and becoming second alternates for a spot at the 2014 Winter Olympics. Plutowska/Gerber won their first international medal, bronze, at the 2013 Finlandia Trophy one week later. They reached the free dance at the 2014 European Championships in Bratislava and finished 16th overall. After taking gold at the 2014 Bavarian Open in February, the two competed at the 2014 World Championships, held in Saitama, Japan in March, and finished 22nd. Their partnership ended suddenly in early May 2014, when Plutowska decided to leave skating for personal reasons.

In the 2015-16 season, Gerber retired from competitive ice dance to pursue a career in professional show skating.

Programs

With Plutowska

With Carroll

Competitive highlights

With Plutowska

With Carroll

References

External links 

 
 
 Baily Carroll / Peter Gerber at Tracings.net
 Baily Carroll / Peter Gerber at Ice-Dance.com
 Baily Carroll / Peter Gerber at SkateOntario.org
 Baily Carroll / Peter Gerber at SkateCanada-CentralOntario.com
 Peter Gerber at Figure Skating Online
 Peter Gerber / Baily Carroll at The Barrie Examiner

1992 births
Living people
Polish male ice dancers
Sportspeople from Etobicoke